Alster is a locality situated in Karlstad Municipality, Värmland County, Sweden with 586 inhabitants in 2010.  See also Gustaf Fröding.

References 

Populated places in Värmland County
Populated places in Karlstad Municipality